Zhang Lingfeng (born 28 February 1997) is a Chinese footballer who currently plays for Suzhou Dongwu in the China League One.

Club career
Zhang Lingfeng moved aboard following Chinese Football Association's 500.com Stars Project. He joined Pombal, Real Massamá and Sporting CP's youth academy between 2011 and 2016. Zhang signed for Campeonato de Portugal side Torreense in July 2016. On 21 August 2016, he made his senior debut in a 1–1 home draw against Vilafranquense. He scored his first goal on 19 March 2017 in a 3–0 home victory over Louletano. Zhang made 28 league appearances and scored two goals for Torreense in his debut season.

Zhang transferred to Chinese Super League side Jiangsu Suning on 28 February 2018. He made his debut for the club on 4 March 2018 in the first league match of the season against Guizhou Hengfeng with a 3–1 away win.

Career statistics
.

Honours

Club
Jiangsu Suning
Chinese Super League: 2020

References

External links
 

1997 births
Living people
Chinese footballers
Sportspeople from Suzhou
Footballers from Jiangsu
S.C.U. Torreense players
Jiangsu F.C. players
Segunda Divisão players
Chinese Super League players
Association football midfielders
Chinese expatriate footballers
Expatriate footballers in Portugal
Chinese expatriate sportspeople in Portugal